John Richard Montague Wilson (30 October 1914 – 2 November 1988) was an English footballer who played on the inside-right for West Bromwich Albion, Port Vale, Wigan Athletic, and Shrewsbury Town.

Career
Wilson played for West Bromwich Albion, before joining Port Vale in May 1935. He failed to gain a regular first team spot and having made just the three Second Division appearances in the 1935–36 season he was transferred away from The Old Recreation Ground to Wigan Athletic in December 1935. Later he moved to Shrewsbury Town.

Career statistics
Source:

References

People from Lanchester, County Durham
Footballers from County Durham
English footballers
Association football forwards
West Bromwich Albion F.C. players
Port Vale F.C. players
Wigan Athletic F.C. players
Shrewsbury Town F.C. players
English Football League players
1914 births
1988 deaths